Carl Anderson (born February 10, 1961) is an American politician. He is a member of the South Carolina House of Representatives from the 103rd District, serving since 2005. He is a member of the Democratic party.

References

Living people
1961 births
Democratic Party members of the South Carolina House of Representatives
African-American state legislators in South Carolina
21st-century American politicians
21st-century African-American politicians
20th-century African-American people